Jalan Kota Bahagia-Melati, Federal Route 2489, is a federal road in Pahang, Malaysia. It is a main route to Bandar Muadzam Shah via Tun Razak Highway.

At most sections, the Federal Route 2489 was built under the JKR R5 road standard, with a speed limit of 90 km/h.

List of junctions

Malaysian Federal Roads